Parasaleniidae is a family of echinoderms belonging to the order Camarodonta.

Genera:
 Diplosalenia
 Parasalenia

References

Camarodonta
Echinoderm families